Joe Tartamella (born June 2, 1979) is the current head coach of the St. John's University women's basketball team.

Head Coaching Record

References 

1979 births
Living people
American women's basketball coaches
James Madison University alumni
People from St. James, New York
Sportspeople from Suffolk County, New York
St. John's Red Storm women's basketball coaches